The chasuble is the outermost liturgical vestment worn by clergy for the celebration of the Eucharist in Western-tradition Christian churches that use full vestments, primarily in Roman Catholic, Anglican, and Lutheran churches. In the Eastern Orthodox Churches and in the Eastern Catholic Churches, the equivalent vestment is the phelonion.

"The vestment proper to the priest celebrant at Mass and other sacred actions directly connected with Mass is, unless otherwise indicated, the chasuble, worn over the alb and stole" (General Instruction of the Roman Missal, 337). Like the stole, it is normally of the liturgical colour of the Mass being celebrated.

Origins 

The chasuble originated as a sort of conical poncho, called in Latin a paenula or casula or "little house", that was the common outer traveling garment in the late Roman Empire. It was simply a roughly oval piece of cloth, with a round hole in the middle through which to pass the head, that fell below the knees on all sides. It had to be gathered up on the arms to allow the arms to be used freely.

In its liturgical use in the West, this garment was folded up from the sides to leave the hands free. Strings were sometimes used to assist in this task, and the deacon could help the priest in folding up the sides of the vestment. Beginning in the 13th century, there was a tendency to shorten the sides a little. In the course of the 15th and 16th centuries, the chasuble took something like its modern form, in which the sides of the vestment no longer reach to the ankle but only, at most, to the wrist, making folding unnecessary.

At the end of the sixteenth century the chasuble, though still quite ample and covering part of the arms, had become less similar to its traditional shape than to that which prevailed in the nineteenth and early twentieth centuries, when the chasuble was reduced to a broad scapular, leaving the whole of the arms quite free, and was shortened also in front and back. Additionally, to make it easier for the priest to join his hands when wearing a chasuble of stiff (lined and heavily embroidered) material, in these later centuries the front was often cut away further, giving it the distinctive shape often called fiddleback. Complex decoration schemes were often used on chasubles of scapular form, especially the back, incorporating the image of the Christian cross or of a saint; and rich materials such as silk, cloth of gold or brocade were employed, especially in chasubles reserved for major celebrations.

Current usage 

In the 20th century, there began to be a return to an earlier, more ample, form of the chasuble, sometimes called "Gothic", as distinguished from the "Roman" scapular form. This aroused some opposition, as a result of which the Sacred Congregation of Rites issued on 9 December 1925 a decree against it, De forma paramentorum which it explicitly revoked with the declaration Circa dubium de forma paramentorum of 20 August 1957, leaving the matter to the prudent judgement of local Ordinaries. There exists a photograph of Pope Pius XI wearing the more ample chasuble while celebrating Mass in Saint Peter's Basilica as early as 19 March 1930.

After the Second Vatican Council, the more ample form became the most usually seen form of the chasuble, and the directions of the GIRM quoted above indicate that "it is fitting" that the beauty should come "not from abundance of overly lavish ornamentation, but rather from the material that is used and from the design. Ornamentation on vestments should, moreover, consist of figures, that is, of images or symbols, that evoke sacred use, avoiding thereby anything unbecoming" (n. 344). Hence, the prevalence today of chasubles that reach almost to the ankles, and to the wrists, and decorated with relatively simple symbols or bands and orphreys. By comparison, "fiddleback" vestments were often extremely heavily embroidered or painted with detailed decorations or whole scenes depicted.

Use of scapular "Roman" chasubles, whether with straight edges or in "fiddleback" form, is often associated with traditionalism. However, some traditionalist priests prefer ampler chasubles of less stiff material.

Pope Benedict XVI sometimes used chasubles of the transitional style common at the end of the 16th century.

In the Slavic tradition, though not in the Greek, the phelonion, the Byzantine Rite vestment that corresponds to the chasuble, is cut away from the front and not from the sides, making it look somewhat like the western cope.

In Catholicism 
Called in Latin casula, planeta or pænula, and in early Gallic sources amphibalus. The chasuble is the principal and most conspicuous Mass vestment, covering all the rest. It is described in prayer as the "yoke of Christ" and said to represent charity. Nearly all ecclesiologists are now agreed that liturgical costume was simply an adaptation of the secular attire commonly worn throughout the Roman Empire in the early Christian centuries. The priest in discharging his sacred functions at the altar was dressed as in civil life, but the custom probably grew up of reserving for this purpose garments that were newer and cleaner than those used in his daily ministry, and out of this gradually developed the conception of a special liturgical attire.

In Protestantism 

Many, but not all, Lutheran and Anglican churches make use of the chasuble. 

The chasuble has always been used by the Lutheran denominations of Scandinavia, although in earlier times its use was not directly connected to the communion. German Lutherans used it for the first two hundred years after the Reformation but later replaced it with the Geneva Gown. A variety of practices emerged in North America but by the mid-20th century, the alb and stole became widely customary. More recently, the chasuble has been readopted for Communion services in both Germany and North America.

It is the stole, not the chasuble, that is the priestly vestment. 
 
The chasuble was never used by low-church Anglicans and rarely used by high-church Anglicans until the Oxford Movement in the 19th century, and even then not until the second generation of the Oxford Movement.

It is not customary and rarely seen in Protestantism outside of the liturgical churches.

Gallery

In popular culture 
In Oscar Wilde's 1895 play The Importance of Being Earnest, Dr. Chasuble is a clergyman who, in the 2002 film adaptation, is seen wearing his namesake vestment.

See also 

 Ritualism in the Church of England

Notes

Citations

Sources

External links 

 Chasuble in Catholic Encyclopedia
 The Development (and Future?) of Vestments in the Roman Rite
 A chasuble, ascribed to Albert the Embroider, second half of the 15th century, in the Uppsala Cathedral Treasury.
 Image 1
 Image 2
 The chasuble from the vestments of the Order of the Golden Fleece in the Secular Treasury of the Hofburg Palace in Vienna.
 

Anglican vestments
Byzantine clothing
Eucharistic vestments
Gowns
History of clothing
History of clothing (Western fashion)
History of fashion
Lutheran vestments
Roman Catholic vestments